House of Frankenstein may refer to:

House of Frankenstein (film), a 1944 horror film produced by Universal Studios
House of Frankenstein (miniseries), a 1997 television miniseries featuring characters from the Universal Studios horror films
House of Frankenstein (play), a Samuel French comedic play involving multiple movie monsters
 House of Franckenstein, the German noble family
The House of Frankenstein, a haunted house attraction in Niagara Falls, Ontario, Canada